The 2020 Phillips 66 Big 12 Conference women's basketball tournament was a postseason tournament for the Big 12 Conference that was scheduled to be held from March 12 to 15, 2020, in Kansas City, Missouri, at the Municipal Auditorium. On March 12, the NCAA announced that the tournament was cancelled due to the coronavirus pandemic before any games were played.

Seeds

See also
2020 Big 12 Conference men's basketball tournament
2020 NCAA Women's Division I Basketball Tournament
2019–20 NCAA Division I women's basketball rankings

References

External links
 2020 Phillips 66 Big 12 Conference women's basketball tournament Official Website

Big 12 Conference women's basketball tournament
Tournament
Big 12 Conference women's basketball tournament
Big 12 Conference women's basketball tournament
College sports tournaments in Missouri
Basketball competitions in Kansas City, Missouri
Big 12 Conference women's basketball tournament